Clurel Eugene Mayfield, known as Gene Mayfield (January 31, 1928 – October 2, 2009), was an American football coach in Texas high schools and at West Texas A&M University. In May 2005, Mayfield was inducted into the Texas High School Coaches Hall of Fame.

Mayfield was born in Quitaque in 
Briscoe County in the lower Texas Panhandle to James Andrew Mayfield (1900–1993) and the former Irma Graves (1901–1984). He graduated from Quitaque High School and attended a year of college before he joined the United States Army during the Korean War. Upon his Army discharge, Mayfield finished college on the G.I. Bill of Rights. He played quarterback and received his bachelor's and master's degrees from West Texas A&M, then West Texas State University, at Canyon, south of Amarillo. While in college, Mayfield met his future wife, Mary Jean Hoover (1929–2005), whom he wed in 1950.

Mayfield began his head coaching career at Littlefield in Lamb County until he moved in 1958 to Borger in Hutchinson County. His 1962 Borger squad made the 4A state championship game, losing 26–30 to San Antonio Brackenridge. In 1965, Mayfield assumed the head coaching duties at Permian High School in Odessa in Ector County, where he started the school's winning tradition by beating San Antonio Lee 11-6 for the 1965 4A state championship, coining the name "father of mojo". Mayfield was only the fifth head coach in Texas' highest classification to win a state championship in his first year. Mayfield led Odessa Permian to the state finals on two other occasions, in 1968 and 1970, losing each time to Austin Reagan.

In 1971, Mayfield succeeded legendary Joe E. Kerbel at his alma mater, West Texas A&M. He had only mediocre success and left the university after the 1976 season with an overall record of 24–39–2. He retired from coaching in 1977 but returned in 1982 to coach at Levelland in Hockley County for six seasons. Mayfield's career high school coaching record was 178–71–8 (.708) In retirement, he was an avid hunter, fisherman, and golfer.

Mayfield died in Lubbock of complications from Alzheimer's disease. Survivors included two sons, Stan Mayfield and wife Cindy of Lubbock and Steve Mayfield of Dallas; a daughter, Rhonne Gary and husband Dan of Amarillo; six grandchildren, Shane Stewart, Layne Mayfield, Charly Mayfield, Rory Mayfield, Reid Mayfield, and Andrew Mayfield; three great-grandchildren, Jordyn, Hunter, and Easton Stewart; a brother, Bill Mayfield of Amarillo; and a sister, Jimmie Richmond of Anson in Jones County, Texas. In addition to his wife, he was preceded in death by a brother, Graves Mayfield.

According to his obituary, Mayfield's "reserved and gentle nature delivered a calm and respectful manner when directing his players. Players and coaches through the years have shared with family members his ability to inspire and change their lives by leading them to meet their potential, which brought them success on the field and in their lives."

Memorial services for Mayfield were held on October 5 at the Lake Ridge United Methodist Church in Lubbock, with the Reverend Don Caywood of Odessa officiating. Interment preceded the services at Quitaque Cemetery.

Head coaching record

College

Further reading

References

External links
 

1928 births
2009 deaths
American football quarterbacks
West Texas A&M Buffaloes athletic directors
West Texas A&M Buffaloes football players
West Texas A&M Buffaloes football coaches
High school football coaches in Texas
United States Army personnel of the Korean War
United States Army soldiers
Sportspeople from Amarillo, Texas
People from Borger, Texas
People from Briscoe County, Texas
People from Lubbock, Texas
People from Odessa, Texas
Neurological disease deaths in Texas
Deaths from Alzheimer's disease
Coaches of American football from Texas